Lah-Di-Dah is a compilation album by Jake Thackray, released by EMI on LP and CD (with bonus tracks) in 1991.

Track listing
All songs written by Jake Thackray, except where noted.
Side one
 "Lah-Di-Dah"
 "On Again! On Again!"
 "Country Bus"
 "Worried Brown Eyes"
 "The Cactus"
 "Jolly Captain"
 "Caroline Diggeby-Pratte"
 "Brother Gorilla" (Le Gorille) (Georges Brassens/Jake Thackray)
 "Sophie"

Side two
 "Personal Column"
 "Jumble Sale"
 "Family Tree"
 "Isobel Makes Love Upon National Monuments"
 "Bantam Cock"
 "The Statues"
 "Sister Josephine"
 "Isobel"
 "The Last Will and Testament of Jake Thackray"

Bonus tracks (CD)
 "The Kiss"
 "The Castleford Ladies Magic Circle"
 "Ulysses"
 "Grand-Daddy"

References

Jake Thackray albums
1991 compilation albums
Albums produced by Norman Newell
EMI Records compilation albums